Kunama may refer to:
 Kunama, New South Wales, a rural locality
 Kunama people
 Kunama language

Language and nationality disambiguation pages